Sara Tan Li Ching (born August 6, 1990) is a Singaporean sailor. She and Griselda Khng placed 15th in the women's 49erFX event at the 2016 Summer Olympics.

References

External links
 

1990 births
Living people
Victoria Junior College alumni
Singaporean female sailors (sport)
Olympic sailors of Singapore
Sailors at the 2016 Summer Olympics – 49er FX
Southeast Asian Games silver medalists for Singapore
Southeast Asian Games medalists in sailing
Competitors at the 2007 Southeast Asian Games
21st-century Singaporean women